Varicellovirus (var′i-sel′ō-vi′rŭs) is a genus of viruses belonging to subfamily Alphaherpesvirinae, a member of family Herpesviridae. Humans and other mammals serve as natural hosts. There are 19 species in this genus. Diseases associated with this genus include: HHV-3—chickenpox (varicella) and shingles; BoHV-1—infectious bovine rhinotracheitis/infectious pustular vulvovaginitis (IPV); and SuHV-1 (also known as pseudorabies virus)—Aujesky's disease.

Species 
The genus consists of the following 19 species:

 Bovine alphaherpesvirus 1
 Bovine alphaherpesvirus 5
 Bubaline alphaherpesvirus 1
 Canid alphaherpesvirus 1
 Caprine alphaherpesvirus 1
 Cercopithecine alphaherpesvirus 9
 Cervid alphaherpesvirus 1
 Cervid alphaherpesvirus 2
 Cervid alphaherpesvirus 3
 Equid alphaherpesvirus 1
 Equid alphaherpesvirus 3
 Equid alphaherpesvirus 4
 Equid alphaherpesvirus 8
 Equid alphaherpesvirus 9
 Felid alphaherpesvirus 1
 Human alphaherpesvirus 3
 Monodontid alphaherpesvirus 1
 Phocid alphaherpesvirus 1
 Suid alphaherpesvirus 1

Structure 
As with other alphaherpesviruses, the virus particle has a layered structure: Virions consist of an envelope, a tegument, a nucleocapsid, and a core. Tegument is disordered; they do not display a structure and proteins in variable amounts are arranged sometimes in an asymmetric layer located between envelope and capsid. The viral capsid is contained within a spherical envelope which is 120–200 nm in diameter.  Surface projections on envelope (viral receptors) are densely dispersed and contain small spikes that evenly dot the surface.

The capsid/nucleocapsid is round with triangulation number T=16 and exhibits icosahedral symmetry. The capsid is isometric and has a diameter of 100–110 nm. The capsid consists of 162 capsomer proteins with a hexagonal base and a hole running halfway down the long axis. The core consists of a fibrillar spool on which the DNA is wrapped. The end of the fibers are anchored to the underside of the capsid shell. It is a double-stranded enveloped DNA virus

Life cycle 
Viral replication is nuclear, and is lysogenic. Entry into the host cell is achieved by attachment of the viral glycoproteins to host receptors, which mediates endocytosis. Replication follows the dsDNA bidirectional replication model. DNA-templated transcription, with some alternative splicing mechanism is the method of transcription. The virus exits the host cell by nuclear egress, and budding.
Humans and mammals serve as the natural host. Only one member of the Varicellovirus genus, Varicella zoster virus (HHV-3) infects Homo sapiens (humans).

References

External links 

 Virus Pathogen Database and Analysis Resource (ViPR): Herpesviridae
 Viralzone: Varicellovirus
 ICTV

 
Virus genera